The Buick Lucerne is a full-size car manufactured by General Motors from 2005 to 2011. Named for the city of Lucerne, Switzerland, it served as Buick's top-of-the-line sedan until it was replaced by the second generation Buick LaCrosse.

History
The Lucerne replaced both the full-size LeSabre and top-of-the-line Park Avenue in the Buick lineup. It was based on a revised G platform, though GM continued to refer to it as the H.

It was introduced with the standard 3.8 liter Buick V6 (also known as the GM 3800 engine), and with a 4.6 liter Cadillac Northstar LD8 V8 and the Chevrolet Corvette's Magnetic Ride Control active suspension available as options. All General Motors 3.8 L V6 powered cars become the first SULEV-compliant vehicles.

Reviving a Buick tradition, the Lucerne featured a faux row of exhaust vents, marketed as "Ventiports," on the front fenders, corresponding to the number of cylinders in the engine — three on each side for the V6 or four for the V8.  The CXL trim package added numerous premium features.

The Lucerne was manufactured at GM's Detroit/Hamtramck Assembly Plant alongside the Cadillac DTS.  The plant won Initial Quality Awards from J.D. Power and Associates from 2004 through 2006. GM also lead all other automakers in Strategic Vision's Total Quality Index (TQI) 

The Super trim level was introduced at the 2007 New York Auto Show, featuring the 4.6 liter Northstar L37 V8; revised trim; an increase of  horsepower, and revised front styling and a rear spoiler.

All Lucernes received modest mid-cycle updates in 2008, adding optional blind spot monitoring and lane departure warning system and revised exterior colors.  Two new trim levels, CXL Special Edition (with more standard features than regular CXL) and Super, were added for 2008.
The 2009 Lucerne received small upgades, including a new base engine, the 3.9 L GM High Value LZ9 V6, Bluetooth phone connectivity, and XM NavTraffic. Flex-fuel technology was made available at no additional cost.

For 2010, the Super's rocker panels, grille, and fog lights were added as standard equipment.

The 2011 Lucerne was largely unchanged. The last was built on June 15, 2011. The second generation LaCrosse replaced it as Buick's flagship sedan for 2012.

Engines

Safety

The Buick Lucerne earns a "Good" overall score in the Insurance Institute for Highway Safety (IIHS) front impact test, and an "Acceptable" score in the side impact test. The IIHS also found that 2006-08 model year Lucerne had the highest fatality rate in the large 4-door car class.

Yearly American sales

References

External links

Lucerne
Front-wheel-drive vehicles
Full-size vehicles
Sedans
2010s cars
Cars introduced in 2005
Motor vehicles manufactured in the United States
Partial zero-emissions vehicles
Flagship vehicles